Li Sen (25 April 1914 – 1942) was a Chinese sprinter. She competed in the women's 100 metres at the 1936 Summer Olympics. She was the first woman to represent China at the Olympics.

References

External links
 

1914 births
1942 deaths
Athletes (track and field) at the 1936 Summer Olympics
Chinese female sprinters
Olympic athletes of China
Place of birth missing
People from Hengyang
Runners from Hunan
Olympic female sprinters
20th-century Chinese women